Frederic Watts (9 September 1884 – 20 February 1968) was an English cricketer. He played one match for Gloucestershire in 1905.

References

1884 births
1968 deaths
English cricketers
Gloucestershire cricketers
People from Cinderford
Sportspeople from Gloucestershire